Enterobacter is a genus of common Gram-negative, facultatively anaerobic, rod-shaped, non-spore-forming bacteria of the family Enterobacteriaceae.  It is the type genus of the order Enterobacterales.  Several strains of these bacteria are pathogenic and cause opportunistic infections in immunocompromised (usually hospitalized) hosts and in those who are on mechanical ventilation.  The urinary and respiratory tracts are the most common sites of infection.  The genus Enterobacter is a member of the coliform group of bacteria. It does not belong to the fecal coliforms (or thermotolerant coliforms) group of bacteria, unlike Escherichia coli, because it is incapable of growth at 44.5 °C in the presence of bile salts.  Some of them show quorum sensing properties.

One clinically important species from this genus is E. cloacae.

Researchers in 2018 reported, after detecting the presence on the International Space Station (ISS) of five Enterobacter bugandensis bacterial strains, none pathogenic to humans, that microorganisms on ISS should be carefully monitored to continue assuring a medically healthy environment for the astronauts.

Biochemical characteristics
The genus Enterobacter ferments lactose with gas production during a 48-hour incubation at 35-37 °C in the presence of bile salts and detergents.  It is oxidase-negative, indole-negative, and urease-variable.

Treatment
Treatment is dependent on local trends of antibiotic resistance. Enterobacter huaxiensis and Enterobacter chuandaensis are two recently discovered species that exhibit especially antibiotic resistant characteristics.

Cefepime, a fourth-generation cephalosporin from the β-Lactam antibiotic class. Imipenem (a carbapenem) is often the antibiotic of choice. Aminoglycosides such as amikacin have been found to be very effective, as well. Quinolones can be an effective alternative.

Linked to obesity

A 2012 study has shown that the presence of Enterobacter cloacae B29 in the gut of a morbidly obese individual may have contributed to the patient’s obesity. Reduction of the bacterial load within the patient’s gut, from 35% E. cloacae B29 to non-detectable levels, was associated with a parallel reduction in endotoxin load in the patient and a concomitant, significant reduction in weight. Furthermore, the same bacterial strain, isolated from the patient, induced obesity and insulin resistance in germfree C57BL/6J mice that were being fed a high-fat diet. The study concludes that E. cloacae B29 may contribute to obesity in its human hosts through an endotoxin-induced, inflammation-mediated mechanism.

References

External links

Enterobacter at BacDive -  the Bacterial Diversity Metadatabase

Enterobacteriaceae
Gram-negative bacteria
Bacteria genera